Wyoming is a 1947 American Western film directed by Joseph Kane and starring Wild Bill Elliott, Vera Ralston and John Carroll. It was produced by Republic Pictures. While Republic specialized in lower-budget second features, it also released more prestigious films such as this in an attempt to compete with the major studios. The film's sets were designed by the art director Frank Hotaling.

Synopsis
When Karen Alderson returns from an education in Europe to Wyoming in the 1890s she finds that her father's large estate is being encroached by homesteaders. A land war breaks out, partly inspired by a cattle rustler who is using the conflict for his own ends. Karen falls in love with Glenn Forrester, her father's foreman, who tries to prevent bloodshed.

Cast
 Wild Bill Elliott as Charles Alderson  
 Vera Ralston as Karen Alderson  
 John Carroll as Glenn Forrester  
 George 'Gabby' Hayes as Windy Gibson  
 Albert Dekker as Duke Lassiter  
 Virginia Grey as Lila Regan  
 Maria Ouspenskaya as Maria  
 Grant Withers as Joe Sublette  
 Harry Woods as Ben Jackson  
 Minna Gombell as Queenie Lassiter  
 Dick Curtis as Ed Lassiter  
 Roy Barcroft as Sheriff Niles  
 Trevor Bardette as Timmons  
 Paul Harvey as Judge Sheridan  
 Louise Kane as Karen, at age 9  
 Tom London as Will Jennings  
 George Chesebro as Henchman Wolff  
 Linda Green as Karen, at age 3 
 Jack O'Shea as Bartender Steve

References

Bibliography
  Len D. Martin. The Republic Pictures Checklist: Features, Serials, Cartoons, Short Subjects and Training Films of Republic Pictures Corporation, 1935-1959. McFarland, 1998.

External links
 

1947 films
1947 Western (genre) films
American Western (genre) films
Films directed by Joseph Kane
Films scored by Ernest Gold
Films scored by Nathan Scott
Republic Pictures films
American black-and-white films
Films set in the 1890s
Films set in Wyoming
1940s English-language films
1940s American films